The men's singles squash event of the 2011 Pan American Games will be held from October 15–17 at the Squash Complex in Guadalajara. The defending Pan American Games champion is Eric Gálvez of Mexico.

The athletes will be drawn into elimination stage draw. Once an athlete loses a match, they will no longer be able to compete.
Each match is contested as the best of five games. A game is won when one side first scores 11 points. A point is awarded to the winning side of each rally. If the score becomes 10-all, the side which gains a two-point lead first, will win that game.

Draw

Finals

Top Half

Bottom Half

References

External links
Men's singles squash draw

Squash at the 2011 Pan American Games